"The Elephant Song" is a song written by Roger Woddis, Gregor Frenkel-Frank and Hans van Hemert. It was recorded by Kamahl in 1975, becoming a major hit song. The song became an anthem for the World Wildlife Fund.

As of August 1978, "The Elephant Song" was the highest selling record in the history of Sweden.

Lyrics
The song is about an elephant who tries to warn people to stop killing animals. During a parlando the elephant delivers his message that "man and beast must work together" and "together (...) will survive".

Charts

Weekly charts

Year-end charts

Certifications

References

1975 songs
1975 singles
Dutch Top 40 number-one singles
Number-one singles in Belgium
Songs written by Hans van Hemert
Kamahl songs
Songs about animal rights
Songs about elephants
Songs about hunters
Environmental songs